RNLB Ruby and Arthur Reed II (ON 1097) was a Tyne-class lifeboat stationed at Cromer in the English county of Norfolk from 16 December 1985 and was the No 1 lifeboat between various relief’s until she was replaced after 21 years service by the Tamar-class  in December 2007. Between 1996 and 1999, during the rebuilding of the pier head lifeboat house and slipway, she was temporarily replaced by a carriage launched Mersey-class lifeboat, . During the time that the Ruby and Arthur Reed was on station at Cromer she performed 120 service launches, rescuing 102 lives including 3 dogs. Nearly 50% of her launches took place during the hours of darkness and 17 of them saw her facing gale force 7 winds. Her service launches included helping 48 merchant and fishing vessels and 47 pleasure craft.

Design and construction 
Ruby and Arthur Reed II was designed as a fast slipway boat (FSB) and featured a semi-planing hull fabricated from steel. This hull had a shallow draught and a long straight keel with a flared bow above the waterline. To protect the propellers they were housed in tunnels with substantial bilge keels, and a straight wide keel ending at a hauling shoe enabling winching for the boat when it was returned up the slipway back into the boathouse. The wheelhouse had a low profile so as to fit into existing boathouses. Amidships there was a flying bridge with a separate cabin aft of the upper steering position.

Equipment 
The lifeboats power came from twin General Motors GM6V92TA DDEC turbo-charged marine two-stroke diesel engines which could develop . At full speed there was enough diesel fuel in the tanks for ten hours service. At lower speeds the endurance was significantly increased. The engines were computer-managed, with data being displayed on twin screens which was viewed at both the Mechanic’s and the Helm position in the wheelhouse. Within the wheelhouse there were six seats for the crew plus a jumper seat for a doctor. Ruby and Arthur Reed’s equipment included satellite navigation apparatus interfaced through a PC to a visual chart display. Daylight viewing radar was used both for navigation and to search for casualties. There was VHF radio direction-finding equipment for locating vessels in trouble. The lifeboat also carried the latest DSC digital radio equipment for the vital radio communication used in search and rescue missions. The lifeboat was equipped with three VHF radios one of which was portable, together with an MF `long range`set. On the deck were powerful searchlights, and the lifeboat was also later equipped with image-intensifying night sight equipment. Ruby and Arthur Reed carried a large amount of first-aid equipment including both oxygen and entonox.

Notable rescues

Yacht Phaedra
During the early hours of 29 September 1988 a gale with winds in force eight to nine had occurred. Caught in this gale where the husband and wife crew of the yacht Phaedra out of Whitby. The skipper had no idea of his position and with the help from power from a car battery had used his VHF radio to call for help to the coastguard. The coastguard using the transmission to gain a bearing for the Phaedra placed her as thirty miles north east of Cromer. The coastguard called out the Ruby and Arthur Reed and within seven minutes of the call she was underway. In the meantime Rig stand-by vessels Desirade, Stout Truck and Vulcan Service were attending the yacht and stood by as she drifted in the relentless weather conditions. To save time reaching the yacht coxswain Richard Davies decided to take the Ruby and Arthur Reed across sandbanks. The coxswain reported that the lifeboat had handled well in the broken waters above the banks and 20 to  waves had come aboard the lifeboats deck. At 2.30am the Ruby and Arthur Reed found the stricken yacht going round in circles with all sails set. At Davies request the sails were lowered and the yacht was taken into tow. The weather conditions made it impossible for the husband and wife to be taken off the yacht or for a lifeboatman to be put aboard. The decision was taken to tow the yacht in a southerly direction towards Bacton, a task that took the lifeboat seven hours. By 10am the lifeboat had towed the yacht to the lee of the land were conditions had improved. Now a crewman was put aboard the Phaedra and with increased speed the vessel was towed into Great Yarmouth by 12.30pm. The adverse conditions however, prevented the Ruby and Arthur Reed from returning to her station for several days.

Award
For this exceptional and difficult service the thanks of the Institution on Vellum was accorded to Coxswain Richard Davis.

Service and rescues

References

Cromer lifeboats
1985 ships
Tyne-class lifeboats